The Las Vegas Metropolitan Police Department is the city-county police force for the City of Las Vegas and Clark County, Nevada.

Las Vegas Police Department may also refer to:

Former Las Vegas Police Department (Nevada), merged with the Clark County Sheriffs Department creating the Las Vegas Metropolitan Police Department in 1973.
Las Vegas Police Department (New Mexico)